Esen may refer to:

Given name
 Esen Buqa I (1310 - c. 1318), Khan of the Chagatai Khanate
 Esen Buqa II (1429–1462), Khan of Moghulistan
 Esen Taishi, 15th-century Oirat leader of Northern Yuan dynasty

Surname
 Aydin Esen (born 1962), Turkish composer
 Barış Esen (born 1986), Turkish chess grandmaster
 Itır Esen (born 1957), Turkish actress
 Emine Ecem Esen (born 1994), Turkish footballer
 Nilay Esen Ersun (born 1987), Turkish marathon runner
 Timuçin Esen (born 1973), Turkish actor

Places
 Esen, Belgium, a village in Belgium
 Esen, Bulgaria, a village in Bulgaria
 Esen, Haymana, a village in Turkey
 Esen, Vezirköprü, a village in Turkey
 Eşen, Manyas, a village in Turkey

Others
 ESEN, Escuela Superior de Economía y Negocios en El Salvador, Central America
 Esen Air, an airline based in Bishkek, Kyrgyzstan

See also 
 Esens (disambiguation)
 Essen (disambiguation)